Nouara Saâdia Djaâfar (born 13 February 1950 in Setif, Algeria) is an Algerian politician and Minister responsible for Family and Women.

Sources

1950 births
Living people
Algerian Berber politicians
Kabyle people
Government ministers of Algeria
National Liberation Front (Algeria) politicians
People from Sétif
21st-century Algerian women politicians
21st-century Algerian politicians
Women government ministers of Algeria
21st-century Algerian people